Derek Prentice (born 13 June 1950) is a British luger. He competed in the men's singles and doubles events at the 1980 Winter Olympics.

References

External links
 

1950 births
Living people
British male lugers
Olympic lugers of Great Britain
Lugers at the 1980 Winter Olympics
Place of birth missing (living people)